For lists of Luxembourg national football team results see:

 Luxembourg national football team results (1910–1959)
 Luxembourg national football team results (1960–1979)
 Luxembourg national football team results (1980–1999)
 Luxembourg national football team results (2000–2019)
 Luxembourg national football team results (2020–present)